Rourke Chartier (born April 3, 1996) is a Canadian professional ice hockey player who is currently playing with the Belleville Senators of the American Hockey League (AHL) while under contract to the Ottawa Senators of the National Hockey League (NHL). Chartier was selected by the San Jose Sharks in the 5th round (149th overall) of the 2014 NHL Entry Draft.

Playing career
On December 31, 2014, Chartier was signed by the San Jose Sharks to a three-year entry-level contract. During the 2014–15 WHL season while playing with the Kelowna Rockets, Chartier scored 48 goals and 34 assists, and was named to the WHL Western Conference First All-Star Team. He was further honoured when he was named the 2014–15 CHL Sportsman of the Year. He scored his first NHL goal on October 29, 2018.

Chartier as a free agent from the Sharks sat out the entirety of the 2019–20 season, due to lingering post-concussion symptoms. On October 14, 2020, Chartier returned to the professional circuit by signing to a one-year AHL contract with the Toronto Marlies. In the pandemic shortened 2020–21 season, Chartier made 28 appearances with the Marlies and finished with 2 goals and 8 points.

Approaching the 2021–22 season, Chartier attended the Belleville Senators training camp and made the opening night roster on a professional try-out basis. In elevating his play, Chartier solidified his role within Belleville and after posting 10 goals and 23 points through 30 games was belatedly signed to a AHL contract on March 15, 2022.

After a successful debut season with Belleville, Chartier would continue with the club after signing a one-year, two-way contract with NHL affiliate, the Ottawa Senators for the  season, on July 15, 2022.

Career statistics

Regular season and playoffs

International

Awards and honours

References

External links

1996 births
Living people
Belleville Senators players
Canadian expatriate ice hockey players in the United States
Canadian ice hockey centres
Ice hockey people from Saskatchewan
Kelowna Rockets players
Ottawa Senators players
Sportspeople from Saskatoon
San Jose Barracuda players
San Jose Sharks draft picks
San Jose Sharks players
Toronto Marlies players